The 1990–91 Southern Miss Golden Eagles basketball team represented the University of Southern Mississippi during the 1990–91 NCAA Division I men's basketball season. The Golden Eagles, led by head coach M. K. Turk, played their home games at Reed Green Coliseum and were members of the Metro Conference. They finished the season 21–8, 10–4 in Metro play to win the conference regular season title. They lost in the quarterfinal round of the Metro tournament to Louisville. Southern Miss received an at-large bid to the 1991 NCAA basketball tournament where they lost in the opening round to NC State, 114–85.

Roster

Schedule and results

|-
!colspan=9 style=| Regular season

|-
!colspan=9 style=| Metro tournament

|-
!colspan=9 style=| 1991 NCAA tournament

Awards and honors
Clarence Weatherspoon – Metro Conference Player of the Year (Second time)

Rankings

References

Southern Miss Golden Eagles basketball seasons
Southern Miss
Southern Miss